I Like Walt is a compilation EP released by Walt Records in 1994 with tracks by Franklin Bruno, Butterglory, Dump, Guiding Genius, Marcellus Hall, and The Mountain Goats.

Track listing

References

1994 compilation albums
1994 EPs